Clint Arlen Lauderdale (September 14, 1932 – December 11, 2009) was an American diplomat
who served as the United States Ambassador Extraordinary and Plenipotentiary to Guyana from 1984 to 1987. He died of chronic obstructive pulmonary disease on December 11, 2009.

Sources
Nomination of Clint Arlen Lauderdale To Be United States Ambassador to Guyana

1932 births
2009 deaths
Ambassadors of the United States to Guyana
20th-century American diplomats